Honora mellinella is a genus of snout moth. It was described by Augustus Radcliffe Grote in 1878. It is found in the south-eastern United States, west through Texas, Arizona, south-eastern California, and eastern Washington. It has also been recorded from Oklahoma.

The length of the forewings is 7–11 mm. The forewings are blackish fuscous with a pale undefined costal shading. The hindwings are very pale fuscous and silky.

The larvae feed on the flower heads of Palafoxia species, including Palafoxia arida.

References

Moths described in 1887
Phycitinae